This is a list of museums in Turkmenistan.

Ashgabat 

 Main building of the State Museum of the State Cultural Center of Turkmenistan
 Museum of the President of Turkmenistan
 Museum of Ethnography and Local History of Turkmenistan

 Turkmen Carpet Museum
 Turkmen Museum of Fine Arts
 Museum of the Academy of Arts of Turkmenistan 
 Museum of the First President of Turkmenistan
 Watan Mukaddesligi Museum at Halk Hakydasy Memorial Complex
 Museum of Neutrality of Turkmenistan at Neutrality Monument
 Museum of Independence of Turkmenistan at Independence Monument
 Museum of the Constitution of Turkmenistan at Monument to the Constitution

Annau 

 Wheat museum (Ak Bugday National Museum )

Mary 
 Museum of Local Lore of Mary Region

Türkmenabat 
 Museum of History and Local Lore of Lebap Region

Balkanabat 
 Museum of History and Local Lore of the Balkan Region

Dashoguz 
 Museum of History and Local Lore of the Dashoguz Region

Turkmenbashi 
 Museum of Local Lore of Turkmenbashi city
 Avaza Ship World Museum

See also 

 List of museums

References

External links 	
 Museum of Turkmenistan
 History of museums of Turkmenistan

Museums
 
Museums
Turkmenistan
Museums
Turkmenistan
Museums